The 2012 APRA Silver Scroll Awards were held on Thursday 13 September 2012 at the Auckland Town Hall, celebrating excellence in New Zealand songwriting. The Silver Scroll Award was presented to New York-based pop artist Stephanie Brown (Lips), and reggae band Herbs was inducted into the New Zealand Music Hall of Fame.

Silver Scroll Award 

The Silver Scroll Award celebrates outstanding achievement in songwriting of original New Zealand pop music. The evening's music performances were produced by Shihad frontman Jon Toogood. Each of the nominated songs were covered in a new style by another artist.

Long list 

In July 2012 a top 20 long list was announced.

Annah Mac "Girl In Stilettos"
Bic Runga "Everything is Beautiful and New"
Cairo Knife Fight "The Origin of Slaves"
Five Mile Town "Fatal Flaw"
Get Well Soon "Hold On"
Grand Rapids "Never Be Without You"
Great North "Lead Me To The Light"
Home Brew "Datura"
Jess Chambers "Hopeful Dreamer"
Jesse Sheehan "By Your Side"
L.A. Mitchell "When it's All Too Much"
Lindon Puffin "Outta Reach"
Lips "Everything To Me"
Lisa Crawley "Blind Eyes"
Lydia Cole "Hibernate"
Opossom "Getaway Tonight"
Ruby Frost "Water to Ice"
Six60 "Forever"
The Adults "Anniversary Day"
The Eastern "State Houses by the River"

New Zealand Music Hall of Fame 

Reggae band Herbs were inducted into the New Zealand Music Hall of Fame by Che Fu. The inducted band members were Dilworth Karaka, Toni Fonoti, Phil Toms, Spencer Fusimalohi, John Berkley, Fred Faleauto and Charles Tumahai, Maurice Watene, Tama Lundon, Jack Allen, Carl Perkins, Willie Hona, Thom Nepia, Tama Renata, Gordon Joll, Grant Pukeroa and Kristen Hapi. Reggae band Kora covered Herbs' song "Rust In Dust", and Dave Dobbyn performed their collaboration "Slice of Heaven".

Other awards 

Four other awards were presented at the Silver Scroll Awards: APRA Maioha Award (for excellence in contemporary Maori music),  SOUNZ Contemporary Award (for creativity and inspiration in composition) and two awards acknowledging songs with the most radio and television play in New Zealand and overseas.

APRA song awards 

Outside of the Silver Scroll Awards, APRA presented four genre awards in 2012. The APRA Best Pacific Song was presented at the Pacific Music Awards, the APRA Best Country Music Song was presented at the New Zealand Country Music Awards and the APRA Children’s Song of the Year and What Now Video of the Year were presented at StarFest.

References 

New Zealand music awards
2012 in New Zealand music